Tann is a town in the district of Fulda, in Hesse, Germany. It is situated in the Rhön Mountains, 27 km northeast of Fulda. It is an accredited Spa town at the Ulster River.

Mayors
 Karl Hilgen (SPD) till 1983
 Wolfgang Schwake (CDU) till 1989
 Dieter Herchenhan] (SPD) till 2001
 Markus Meysner (CDU) till 2013
 Mario Dänner (independent) since 2013

Buildings

Sons and daughters of the town
 Johann Ludwig Klüber (1762-1837), state lawyer and writer

Personalities who have worked on the spot
 Johann Michael Bach (musician at Wuppertal) (1745-1820), a member of the musical Bach family. Worked in Tann as a church musician (1786 to ca. 1795)
 Sebastian Kehl (born 1980, Fulda), grew up in the district Lahrbach, professional football player (Borussia Dortmund

References

Fulda (district)
Rhön Mountains
Towns in Hesse